"Here's Where the Story Ends" is a song by English alternative rock band the Sundays, released as the second single from their debut album Reading, Writing and Arithmetic.

Although it was the Sundays' biggest hit internationally, topping the U.S. Modern Rock Tracks chart for one week, the track was never released as a single in the group's native United Kingdom due to the collapse of the Rough Trade Records label. Nonetheless, it achieved a No. 36 placing in John Peel's Festive Fifty for 1990.

Many artists have covered this song, including Chinese star Faye Wong as "Being Criminal" on Ingratiate Oneself in 1994, and Tin Tin Out who reached number seven on the UK Singles Chart in 1998, as well as No. 15 on the U.S. Hot Dance Music/Club Play chart.

Tin Tin Out's cover version also earned the song the 1999 Ivor Novello Award for "Best Contemporary Song". Crystal Bowersox covered the song on her second album, All That for This.

Reception
Pitchfork said the song, "had more than one leg stuck in the 1980s, its gentle jangle pop and bookish miserabilism inevitably recalling fellow Rough Trade signees the Smiths. At the same time, [it] has such a titanically strong pop melody—conveying a bittersweet tale of nostalgic longing—that it feels untethered to anything as prosaic as the calendar year."

Charts

Tin Tin Out version

English electronic music duo Tin Tin Out comprising Darren Stokes and Lindsay Edwards recorded "Here's Where the Story Ends" for their second album, Always, in 1998. It features vocals by singer Shelley Nelson. The track reached number one on the UK airplay charts and peaked at number 7 on the UK Singles Chart. It peaked at number 10 in Scotland and number 21 in Iceland. On the Eurochart Hot 100, the song reached number 30 in April 1998. Outside Europe, "Here's Where the Story Ends" peaked at number 15 on the Billboard Hot Dance Club Play chart in the US and number 45 in New Zealand.

Critical reception
Daily Record said the song is "great". Music & Media wrote, "This dance duo - DJ Darren Stokes and multi-instrumentalist Lindsay Edwards - started out as remixers for the likes of Urban Cookie Collective, Espiritu and Captain Hollywood. However, their own output could just as easily be described as pop with a strong dance element as the other way around. Here‘s Where The Story Ends has taken the British Isles by storm, and first indications are that it could also do pretty well on the continent. A host of remixes render the song suitable for formats ranging from fairly mellow AC to dance." Marcus Berkmann from The Spectator called it a "redundant new interpretation". He added, "So perhaps we should praise the enterprise, if nothing else, of Tin Tin Out (whoever they are) for taking one of the Sundays' best tunes, reproducing it almost exactly and then slapping a thumpy dance beat all over it. Result: instant top ten single, which is one more than the Sundays themselves have managed up to now." Sunday Mirror described the song as a "good (but sacrilegious) version" and picked it as one of the "highlights" from the Always album.

Track listings

Charts

Weekly charts

Year-end charts

See also
List of Billboard number-one alternative singles of the 1990s

References

1989 songs
1990 singles
1990s ballads
1998 singles
DGC Records singles
Pop ballads
Rough Trade Records singles
Songs written by Harriet Wheeler
The Sundays songs
Tin Tin Out songs
Hut Records singles